Aiyaz Sayed-Khaiyum  (born 24 September 1965) is an Fijian politician and a former cabinet minister. He was the Fijian attorney general and the Minister for Economy, Civil Service and Communications, and also served as the minister responsible for climate change under the FijiFirst government. He is the third-highest polling candidate from the Fijian general elections of 2014 and 2018.

Prior to his appointment as a cabinet minister following FijiFirst's general election victory in September 2014, Sayed-Khaiyum was the Fijian attorney general and the Minister for Justice, Anti-Corruption, Public Enterprises, Communications, Civil Aviation, and the Minister responsible for Elections under the Bainimarama Government.

According to The Economist, the daily functioning of the Fijian government is run by Sayed-Khaiyum. The South China Morning Post describes Khaiyum as one of the South Pacific's most powerful men.

Sayed-Khaiyum is the General Secretary of the FijiFirst party. He also serves as the Fijian Governor in the Asian Development Bank, and has been the ADB Chair of the Board of Governors since 2018.

Following Frank Bainimarama's recovery from heart surgery in January 2022, Sayed-Khaiyum was named Acting Prime Minister.

Early life and education 
Sayed-Khaiyum was born and raised in Suva and was educated at Marist Brothers High School. He has a master's degree in law from the University of Hong Kong, a bachelor's degree in law from the University of New South Wales, a graduate diploma in legal practice from the University of Wollongong, and a bachelor's degree in political science from the Australian National University. He was a former senior legal officer in the Office of the Director of Public Prosecutions. Sayed-Khaiyum was the General Manager of Legal and Compliance and was the Company Secretary in the Colonial Group of Companies for five years immediately prior to his appointment in the Interim Government by the President of Fiji. He also worked with the law firm of Minter Ellison in Sydney. He was on the board of Transparency International Fiji and has been President of the Fiji Young Lawyers Association.

Political career
Sayed-Khaiyum was appointed to the interim government of Frank Bainimarama after the 2006 Fijian coup d'état as Interim Attorney-General and Justice Minister. The 2006 coup has been described by some political historians as a final intervention intended to unite the country and forever put an end to the nation's spate of ethno-nationalist military takeovers.

When Bainimarama formed the FijiFirst Party, Sayed-Khaiyum was appointed its general secretary.

Sayed-Khaiyum contested the 2014 election as a member of the FijiFirst Party, winning 13,753 votes, the third-highest polling candidate. He contested the 2018 Fijian general election as a member of the FijiFirst Party winning 17,271 votes, again placing as the third-highest polling candidate.

Political reforms 
Sayed-Khaiyum led the finalisation of the 2013 Fijian Constitution which established common and equal Fijian citizenry and an equally weighted voting system.

In the lead-up to the 2014 general election, Sayed-Khaiyum helped to implement a new system of electronic voter registration, shape Fiji's new political party and electoral laws and attract international assistance.

Economic reforms 
As the Minister for Economy, Sayed-Khaiyum raised the income tax threshold from $16,000 to $30,000 and has progressively decreased Fiji's unemployment. Fiji is currently experiencing its lowest unemployment rate in 15 years, and the country's economy has recorded an unprecedented ten consecutive years of growth.

Sayed-Khaiyum is currently overseeing a programme of civil service reform within the Fijian Government to promote merit-based recruitment and advancement.

Climate change advocacy 
As Minister responsible for climate change and the leader of Fiji's COP23 delegation, the Attorney-General is also a global proponent of climate adaptation and increasing access to climate finance, and is working with governments, multilateral organisations and development banks to allow countries such as Fiji to obtain adequate levels of funding—on the basis of vulnerability—to build their resilience to climate change. At the COP23 negotiations, where Fiji served as president, parties agreed that the Adaptation Fund would serve the Paris Agreement on Climate Change, and the Fund was replenished with an impressive total of US$93.3 million.

In Fiji, Sayed-Khaiyum spearheaded the creation of the climate change division in the Ministry of Economy to mainstream the critical issue in national planning and public financing decisions, making Fiji one of the few countries in the world where climate change sits with the ministry responsible for finance. He has also established a working group in the Office of the Attorney-General to examine peripheral legal issues related to climate change.

Communications reforms 
During Sayed-Khaiyum's tenure as Minister for Communications, Fiji has experienced a boom in access to high-speed internet services and Free-to-Air digital television, which is now available all throughout the geographically-remote nation.

Sayed-Khaiyum is overseeing the Fijian Government's digital transformation programme to digitise government services through a flagship partnership with the Singaporean Cooperation Enterprise, digitalFIJI.

2022 election
He was re-elected in the 2022 Fijian general election with 22524 votes. Following the election and the formation of a new coalition government he refused to concede defeat, saying that there was no change in government until there was a vote in parliament. He also questioned the validity of the new coalition citing concerns raised previously by SODELPA's outgoing general secretary and called Sitiveni Rabuka divisive. A police complaint was subsequently filed against him for inciting communal hatred.

Following the election of Sitiveni Rabuka as Prime Minister he was appointed as the Leader of the Opposition's nominee to the Constitutional Offices Commission, surrendering his seat in parliament.

Personal life 
Aiyaz Sayed-Khaiyum is the son of former MP Sayed Abdul Khaiyum. In 2011 he married Ela Gavoka, the daughter of MP Viliame Gavoka, they have two sons and a daughter together.

References

|-

|-

|-

|-

|-

|-

|-

1965 births
Living people
Fijian Muslims
20th-century Fijian lawyers
Australian National University alumni
University of New South Wales Law School alumni
Alumni of the University of Hong Kong
University of Wollongong alumni
Communication ministers of Fiji
Finance Ministers of Fiji
Justice ministers of Fiji
Trade ministers of Fiji
Tourism ministers of Fiji
FijiFirst politicians
Companions of the Order of Fiji
Indian members of the Parliament of Fiji
Attorneys-general of Fiji
Politicians from Nadroga-Navosa Province
21st-century Fijian lawyers